Oscar Luigi Scalfaro (9 September 1918 – 29 January 2012) was the president of Italy from 1992 to 1999. A member of Christian Democracy (DC), he became an independent politician after the DC's dissolution in 1992, and was close to the centre-left Democratic Party when it was founded in 2007.

Biography
Scalfaro was born in Novara, Province of Novara, on 9 September 1918, son of Guglielmo, Barone Scalfaro (born Naples, 21 December 1888) and wife Rosalia Ussino. He was raised in a religious atmosphere. He became a member of the association Azione Cattolica (Catholic Action) at the age of 12 and kept its badge on his lapel until his death.

Scalfaro studied law at Milan's Università Cattolica and graduated on 30 July 1941. On 21 October 1942, he entered the magistrature. In 1945, after the end of World War II, he became a public prosecuting attorney, and to date he is the last Italian attorney to have obtained a death sentence: in July of that year, along with two others, he was public prosecutor in the trial against former Novara prefect Enrico Vezzalini and servicemen Arturo Missiato, Domenico Ricci, Salvatore Santoro, Giovanni Zeno and Raffaele Infante, accused of "collaborating with the German invaders". After a three-day-long debate, all six were condemned to death. The sentence was carried out on 23 September 1945. Later on, he obtained one more death sentence, but the accused was pardoned before the execution could take place. In 1946 he was elected to the Constituent Assembly and later in 1948 he became a deputy representing the district of Turin. He was re-elected ten times in a row until 1992. Within the Democrazia Cristiana party he was associated with its right wing.

On 25 May 1992, he was elected as President of the Italian Republic, after a two-week stalemate of unsuccessful attempts to reach agreement. The killing of anti-Mafia magistrate Giovanni Falcone prompted his election. His mandate ended in May 1999, and he automatically became a lifetime member of the Senate.

On 7 April 1994, Scalfaro co-officiated at the Papal Concert to Commemorate the Shoah at the Sala Nervi in Vatican City, along with Pope John Paul II, and Chief Rabbi of Rome Elio Toaff.

In recent times, Scalfaro was the chairman of the committee that advocated the abrogation, in the referendum of 25 and 26 June 2006, on the constitutional reform that had been passed in parliament the previous year by the former center-right majority. Along with all the center-left (and a few center-right personalities, too), Scalfaro considered it to be dangerous for national unity and for other reasons. The opponents of the reform won a landslide victory in the referendum.

Scalfaro was the oldest surviving former Italian president and the second oldest member of the Senate, after Rita Levi-Montalcini. He consequently took the temporary presidency of the newly elected assembly which followed the 2006 general election, as Levi Montalcini refused the role because of her age. This made him one of the three politicians in Italian history to have presided over the three highest-ranked offices in the Italian Republic: President of the Republic, President of the Senate, and President of the Chamber of Deputies; the others are Sandro Pertini and Enrico De Nicola.

A staunch Catholic, and in the past a rather conservative and anti-communist politician, Scalfaro nevertheless distrusted many members of the DC who changed support to Forza Italia, and was consistently on bad terms with Silvio Berlusconi. He openly supported the centre-left coalition, which included Democratic Party of the Left, which won the 1996 and 2006 elections. Despite his age, he also actively campaigned, for the "No" side, in the June 2006 referendum on a constitutional reform. This reform had been proposed by Berlusconi's House of Freedom coalition during its control of the government.

During the Second World War, in 1944, Scalfaro lost his 20-year-old wife Maria Inzitari, by whom he had a daughter, Marianna. He never married again.

After the 2008 parliamentary election, he was again asked to preside as pro tempore Speaker of the Senate after Rita Levi-Montalcini again refused the post, but this time he also declined to serve.

Honours and awards
As President of the Italian Republic, Scalfaro was Head of several Italian Orders from 28 May 1992 to 15 May 1999: the Order of Merit of the Italian Republic, the Military Order of Italy, the Order of the Star of Italian Solidarity, the Order of Merit for Labour and the Order of Vittorio Veneto. Personally, he was awarded the Gold Medal of Merit for School, Culture and Art on 31 July 1973.

He also received several foreign honours:
Knight of Magistral Grace of the Sovereign Military Order of Malta (1950)
Bailiff Grand Cross of Honour and Devotion of the Sovereign Military Order of Malta
 : Knight of the Order of the Elephant (19 October 1993)
 : Honorary Companion of Honour with Collar of the National Order of Merit (16 November 1995)
 : Knight of the Collar of the Order of Isabella the Catholic (27 June 1996)
 : Grand Cross (or 1st Class) of the Order of the White Double Cross (1997)
 : Knight Grand Cross of the Grand Order of King Tomislav ("For outstanding contribution to the promotion of friendship and development co-operation between the Republic of Croatia and the Italian Republic." - 17 December 1997)
 : Collar of the Order of the Cross of Terra Mariana
 : Knight of the Order of the Three Stars, First Class
 : Grand Cross of the Order of Vytautas the Great (19 May 1997)
 : Knight Grand Cross of the Order of the White Eagle
 : Medal of the Oriental Republic of Uruguay (1995)

Electoral history

References

External links

Encyclopædia Britannica, Oscar Luigi Scalfaro - full access article
  La biografia del presidente
 

1918 births
2012 deaths
People from Novara
People of Campanian descent
People of Calabrian descent
Italian Roman Catholics
Christian Democracy (Italy) politicians
Presidents of Italy
Italian Ministers of the Interior
Transport ministers of Italy
Members of the Constituent Assembly of Italy
Presidents of the Chamber of Deputies (Italy)
Deputies of Legislature I of Italy
Deputies of Legislature II of Italy
Deputies of Legislature III of Italy
Deputies of Legislature IV of Italy
Deputies of Legislature V of Italy
Deputies of Legislature VI of Italy
Deputies of Legislature VII of Italy
Deputies of Legislature VIII of Italy
Deputies of Legislature IX of Italy
Deputies of Legislature X of Italy
Deputies of Legislature XI of Italy
Italian life senators
Politicians of Piedmont
Italian anti-fascists
Università Cattolica del Sacro Cuore alumni

Collars of the Order of Isabella the Catholic
Honorary Companions of Honour with Collar of the National Order of Merit (Malta)
Grand Crosses of the Order of Vytautas the Great
Recipients of the Collar of the Order of the Cross of Terra Mariana
Knights of Magistral Grace of the Sovereign Military Order of Malta
Recipients of the Medal of the Oriental Republic of Uruguay
Recipients of the Order of the White Eagle (Poland)
Recipients of the Order of Prince Yaroslav the Wise, 1st class